John McEntee may refer to:

John McEntee (Gaelic footballer) (born 1977)
John McEntee (musician) (fl. 1989–present)
John McEntee (political aide) (born 1990), director of the White House Presidential Personnel Office in the Trump Administration